Rabbi Rachel Mikva is the Rabbi Herman E. Schaalman Chair & Associate Professor of Jewish Studies, and Senior Faculty Fellow of the InterReligious Institute at Chicago Theological Seminary, Illinois, United States. In 2009, Mikva was awarded a grant by the American Academy for Jewish Research to develop electronic formats for Hebrew Scriptures.

References

Year of birth missing (living people)
Living people
American rabbis
21st-century American Jews
Women rabbis